Undercover is the 17th British and 19th American studio album by English rock band the Rolling Stones, released on 7 November 1983 by Rolling Stones Records. The band would move the label to Columbia Records for its follow-up, 1986's Dirty Work.

After the band's preceding studio album Tattoo You (1981) was mostly patched together from a selection of outtakes, Undercover was their first release of all-new recordings in the 1980s. Tensions in the studio were high, as each of the principal songwriters wanted to take the band in a different direction. Vocalist Mick Jagger sought to adapt to modern trends in music, favouring reggae, worldbeat, and new wave musical textures, while guitarist Keith Richards wanted the band to return to their blues rock roots. As a result, the album is an eclectic collection of songs covering a wide range of styles. Besides the other principal band members, including guitarist Ronnie Wood, bassist Bill Wyman, and drummer Charlie Watts, the album featured many guest musicians. It would be the last album released during the lifetime of Ian Stewart, a former member of the band and frequent contributor on piano.

It would be the first Rolling Stones album in more than a decade to miss reaching No. 1 on the U.S. album charts, peaking at No. 4. Three singles were released from the album, with the highest-charting being top-40 release "Undercover of the Night."

History
Due to the recent advancements in recording technology, Mick Jagger and Keith Richards were officially joined in the producer's seat by Chris Kimsey, the first outside producer the Stones had used since Jimmy Miller. They began recording at the Pathé Marconi Studios in Paris, France in November 1982. After breaking for the Christmas holidays, they completed the album in New York City the following summer.

The making of Undercover was an arduous process, largely because Jagger and Richards' famous mid-1980s row began during these sessions. Jagger was keenly aware of new styles and wanted to keep The Rolling Stones current and experimental, while Richards was seemingly more focused on the band's rock and blues roots. As a result, there was friction, and the tension between the two key members would increase over the coming years. A compounding factor was the fact that Richards had emerged (to an extent) from his self-destructive lifestyle of the previous decade, and thus sought a more active role in the creative direction of the band, much to the chagrin of Jagger, who'd enjoyed nearly a decade in relative control of the band.

The lyrics on Undercover are among Jagger's most macabre, with much grisly imagery to be found in the lead single and top 10 hit "Undercover of the Night," a rare political track about Central America, as well as "Tie You Up (The Pain of Love)" and "Too Much Blood," Jagger's attempt to incorporate contemporary trends in dance music.

Musically, Undercover appears to duel between hard rock, reggae and new wave, reflecting the leadership tug of war between Jagger and Richards at the time. "Pretty Beat Up" is largely a Ronnie Wood composition, and Jagger and Richards were both reportedly reluctant to include it on the album.

"Think I'm Going Mad" was a track first recorded during the Emotional Rescue sessions of 1979 and appeared as the B-side to the "She Was Hot" single. It was not included on the Rarities 1971–2003 collection and was finally released on CD on the Singles 1971–2006 box set compilation.

Release and reception

Undercover was released in November 1983, reaching No. 3 in the UK and No. 4 in the United States. It was a relative disappointment, however, breaking a streak of eight No. 1 albums (excluding compilations and live albums) in the United States and failing to spawn any huge singles.

Undercover was the fourth consecutive Rolling Stones album to have its art direction handled by Peter Corriston (who had won a Grammy for his work on Tattoo You), with concept origination, photography and illustration by Hubert Kretzschmar. The album's cover artwork was covered with real peel-off stickers on the original vinyl edition, which when removed revealed other patterned geometric shapes.

Contemporary critical reception to the album was mixed. In a review in Rolling Stone, Kurt Loder gave the album 4.5 stars, calling it "rock & roll without apologies". On the other hand, Robert Christgau called it a "murky, overblown, incoherent piece of shit" and labelled it the band's "worst studio album."

Many fans have come to regard the album as among the Stones' weaker releases, a view echoed by Jagger himself in later interviews. While some critics tended to blame the production, a large part of the album was done in a hard-rock style ("She Was Hot," "Too Tough," "All The Way Down" and "It Must Be Hell"), leading many to fault the inconsistent material. Some later reviews have attributed the album's eclecticism and nastiness to the Jagger/Richards feud.

Legacy

Undercover was the last Rolling Stones album distributed in North America via Rolling Stones Records' original distribution deal with Warner Music Group's Atlantic Records subsidiary. The album would be reissued in 1986 by CBS/Sony Music following the Stones' signing to that label. Undercover was subsequently remastered and reissued by Virgin Records in 1994, and again in 2009 by Universal Music. It was released on SHM-SACD in 2012 by Universal Music Japan.

Original cassettes and later CD reissues (post-EMI) of this album contain a different edit of "Wanna Hold You" from what appeared on the original vinyl release. The original cassette release includes the verse "You sure look good to me, so what's it gonna be, it's up to you to choose, I'll make you an offer you can't refuse". This version runs 3:50.

Track listing

Other songs

Personnel
Adapted from Undercover liner notes.

The Rolling Stones
Mick Jagger – lead vocals, rhythm guitar, harmonica
Keith Richards – rhythm & lead guitar, backing vocals; lead vocals on "Wanna Hold You"; bass guitar on "Pretty Beat Up"
Ronnie Wood – rhythm and lead guitar, backing vocals; bass guitar on "Tie You Up" and "Wanna Hold You"
Bill Wyman – bass guitar, percussion; Yamaha piano on "Pretty Beat Up"
Charlie Watts – drums

Additional personnel
Chuck Leavell – keyboards
Ian Stewart – piano on "She Was Hot" and "Pretty Beat Up", percussion
David Sanborn – saxophone
CHOPS – horns
Sly Dunbar – percussion
Moustapha Cissé – percussion
Ibrahima Coundoul – percussion
Martin Ditcham – percussion
Jim Barber – additional guitar on "Too Much Blood"

Technical
Hubert Kretzschmar – cover art photographer and illustrator
Peter Corriston – cover art designer
Bob Clearmountain – mixing engineer

Charts

Weekly charts

Year-end charts

Certifications

References

External links

1983 albums
Albums produced by Chris Kimsey
Albums produced by the Glimmer Twins
Rolling Stones Records albums
The Rolling Stones albums
Virgin Records albums
Disco albums by English artists
Albums with cover art by Peter Corriston